Chen Fanghui (born 18 April 2000) is a Chinese badminton player.

Achievements

BWF World Tour (2 runners-up)
The BWF World Tour, which was announced on 19 March 2017 and implemented in 2018, is a series of elite badminton tournaments sanctioned by the Badminton World Federation (BWF). The BWF World Tour is divided into levels of World Tour Finals, Super 1000, Super 750, Super 500, Super 300, and the BWF Tour Super 100.

Mixed doubles

BWF International Challenge/Series (1 title, 1 runner-up) 
Mixed doubles

  BWF International Challenge tournament
  BWF International Series tournament
  BWF Future Series tournament

References

External links 

2000 births
Living people
Badminton players from Guangdong
Chinese female badminton players
21st-century Chinese women